Dimitrios Pinakas (born 1 September 2001) is a Greek professional footballer who plays as an attacking midfielder for Olympiacos B.

Career

AEL
Pinakas made his professional debut in a home cup game against Irodotos, which ended as a 4–1 win, on 30 October 2018. In the 2019–20 season he made a total of 9 appearances, making a positive impression.

On 29 July 2020, he signed a new three-year contract with the club, running until the summer of 2023.

In the opening game of the 2020–21 season against PAOK, Pinakas came in as a substitute and wore the captain's armband for the first time in his career. After the end of the match, he expressed his gratitude for this honour. On 28 September 2020, he scored his first goal, salvaging a point for his team a few minutes before the final whistle, with the final 1–1 home draw against Panathinaikos. On 31 October 2020, he scored with a penalty early in the first half, opening the score in a 1–1 away draw against Volos. Four days later, he scored a brace, helping to a 2–1 away win against PAS Giannina, the first of the season.

In December 2020, Pinakas scored a temporary equalizer in an eventual 5–1 away defeat against Olympiacos.

Olympiacos
On 30 August 2021, AEL announced that they had sold Pinakas to Olympiacos for a fee in the region of €1,500,000, and a resale rate of 15%.

Career statistics

References

2001 births
Living people
Greek footballers
Greece youth international footballers
Super League Greece players
Athlitiki Enosi Larissa F.C. players
Association football midfielders
Footballers from Larissa